Sir James Stewart, 7th Baronet ( – 20 May 1827) was an Irish politician.

Early life
Stewart was born the eldest son and heir of Sir Annesley Stewart, 6th Baronet of Fort Stewart, County Donegal, and Mary ( Moore) Stewart. His father was an MP for Ballynakill in the Parliament of Ireland. He was educated privately and at Trinity College, Dublin and succeeded his father in 1801.

His paternal grandparents were Gertrude ( Baillie) Moore (a daughter of Capt. Francis Baillie) and John Moore of Drumbanagher, also an MP for Ballynakill.

Career
From 1783 to 1790, he represented Enniskillen in the Parliament of Ireland. He was appointed High Sheriff of Donegal for 1799 and served in that role until 1800. In 1802, he represented County Donegal in the Parliament of the United Kingdom, serving until 1818.

Personal life
On 19 December 1778, Steward married Mary Susanna Whaley, the daughter of Richard Chapell Whaley, MP of Whaley Abbey. Together, they were the parents of two sons and three daughters, including:

 Anne Stewart (d. 1867), who married William Conolly Staples, son of John Staples, Irish MP, in July 1797. After his death in 1798, she married Richard Napier.
 Elizabeth Susanna Stewart (d. 1844), who married Charles Moysey, Archdeacon of Bath, in 1820.
 Sophia Frances Stewart (d. 1852), who married Andrew Rutherfurd, Lord Rutherfurd.
 Sir James Annesley Stewart, 8th Baronet (1788–1879), who married Jane Mansfield, daughter of Francis Mansfield, in 1830.
 William Henry Stewart (1793–1820), who fought in the Waterloo Campaign and died unmarried.

Sir James died on 20 May 1827 and was succeeded in the baronetcy by his son, James. As his son died without issue in 1879, the baronetcy passed to a distant cousin, Augustus Abraham James Stewart (1832–1889), who became the 9th Baronet.

References

External links 
 

Date of birth unknown
1827 deaths
Alumni of Trinity College Dublin
High Sheriffs of Donegal
Members of the Parliament of the United Kingdom for County Donegal constituencies (1801–1922)
Politicians from County Donegal
Baronets in the Baronetage of Ireland
UK MPs 1802–1806
UK MPs 1806–1807
UK MPs 1807–1812
UK MPs 1812–1818
Year of birth uncertain